Maya Ray was a lawyer and an Indian politician from West Bengal. She was elected in a Bye election  to the Lok Sabha, the lower house of the Parliament of India from Raiganj, West Bengal, in 1972.

Career
The Bye election was necessitated after her husband Siddhartha Shankar Ray resigned the seat after he became the Chief Minister of West Bengal in 1972.

As a lawyer she was once referred to as "a noted barrister and former elected official" by the late Thomas J. Manton, a member of the United States House of Representatives.

Death
She died of kidney failure on 11 March 2013, two and a quarter years after her husband died.

References

Lok Sabha members from West Bengal
India MPs 1971–1977
2013 deaths
1927 births
Indian National Congress politicians from West Bengal